

Ælfwold (or Ælfweald or Aelfwold) was a medieval Bishop of Crediton.

Ælfwold was elected to Crediton in 953. He died in 972.

Citations

References

External links
 

Bishops of Crediton (ancient)
10th-century English bishops
972 deaths
Year of birth unknown